Aethiopicodynerus schulthessi is a species of wasp in the family Vespidae. It was described by Meade-Waldo in 1915.

References

Potter wasps
Insects described in 1915